Narva railway station is the easternmost railway station in Estonia, serving the city of Narva.

The station was opened in 1870, and the first station building was destroyed in 1919 during the Estonian War of Independence. The second station building was constructed in 1922, and it was demolished during World War II. Following World War II, the current neoclassical station building was constructed.

The station building today hosts a passport control and customs office, which are open when trains to/from Russia depart/arrive. The waiting hall is open during daytime, but has no facilities, such as luggage lockers, WC nor a ticket office (the nearby bus station has a toilet but no left luggage service). Access to platforms is only possible in conjunction with train departures and arrivals. 

In the 2018 timetable, there are 4 passenger trains a day to Tallinn Balti jaam operated by Elron (rail transit).

See also 
 List of railway stations in Estonia
 Rail transport in Estonia

References

External links 

 Timetables of the domestic lines
 Official website of Eesti Raudtee (EVR) – the national railway infrastructure company of Estonia  responsible for maintenance and traffic control of most of the Estonian railway network
 Official website of Elron – the national passenger train operating company of Estonia operating all domestic passenger train service

Railway stations in Estonia
Railway stations opened in 1870
1870s establishments in Estonia
Buildings and structures in Narva
Transport in Narva